
Year 699 (DCXCIX) was a common year starting on Wednesday (link will display the full calendar) of the Julian calendar. The denomination 699 for this year has been used since the early medieval period, when the Anno Domini calendar era became the prevalent method in Europe for naming years.

Events 
 By place 
 Umayyad Caliphate 
 Umayyad troops invade Armenia, and secure the submission of Prince Smbat VI Bagratuni. The South Caucasus becomes a viceroyalty called al-Arminiya, and is divided into four regions: Caucasian Albania, Caucasian Iberia, the area around the Aras River, and Taron (modern Turkey).

 Asia 
 June 26 – En no Ozunu, Japanese ascetic, is banished to Izu Ōshima (a volcanic island in the Izu Islands), and accused of confusing the mind of the people with magic. He will be later regarded as the founder of a folk religion called Shugendō.

Births 
 Abū Hanīfa, Arab imam and scholar (d. 767)
 Wang Wei, Chinese poet (d. 759)

Deaths 
 Niitabe, Japanese princess
 Ōe, Japanese princess
 Seaxburh of Ely, queen of Kent
 Werburgh, Anglo-Saxon princess
 Yuge, Japanese prince

References

Sources